Thout 14 - Coptic Calendar - Thout 16

The fifteenth day of the Coptic month of Thout, the first month of the Coptic year. On a common year, this day corresponds to September 12, of the Julian Calendar, and September 25, of the Gregorian Calendar. This day falls in the Coptic season of Akhet, the season of inundation.

Commemorations

Feasts 

 Coptic New Year Period

Saints 
 The departure of Saint Athanasius El-Quosy

Other commemorations 
 The translocation of the body of Saint Stephen the Archdeacon

References 

Days of the Coptic calendar